This is the results breakdown of the local elections held in Castilla–La Mancha on 3 April 1979. The following tables show detailed results in the autonomous community's most populous municipalities, sorted alphabetically.

Overall

City control
The following table lists party control in the most populous municipalities, including provincial capitals (shown in bold).

Municipalities

Albacete
Population: 105,408

Ciudad Real
Population: 48,075

Cuenca
Population: 38,601

Guadalajara
Population: 47,758

Talavera de la Reina
Population: 59,515

Toledo
Population: 54,999

References

Castilla-La Mancha
1979